Georges Senecot (born 14 June 1941) is a French diver. He competed in the men's 3 metre springboard event at the 1960 Summer Olympics.

References

External links
 
 

1941 births
Living people
French male divers
Olympic divers of France
Divers at the 1960 Summer Olympics
Divers from Paris
20th-century French people